The United States men's national inline hockey team is based in Colorado Springs, Colorado. The team that competes in the IIHF InLine Hockey World Championships is controlled by USA Hockey, while the team that competes in the FIRS Senior Men's Inline Hockey World Championships is controlled by USA Roller Sports. The United States has won 6 of 18 IIHF gold medals and 14 of 18 FIRS gold medals at world championships.

Roster
As of 2013 IIHF InLine Hockey World Championships.

See also
List of United States national inline hockey team rosters

.
National inline hockey teams
Inline hockey